The Urethra Chronicles II: Harder Faster Faster Harder is a documentary about pop punk band Blink-182. It is the follow-up to the first Urethra Chronicles. The DVD was released by MCA Records on May 7, 2002, and contains music videos, bonus footage, making of videos, band biographies, and other bonus content.

Scene index
Opening
Travis
Tom
Mark
Past, Present, and the Paranormal
Sin City
Making of "The Rock Show"
Tour Life
Backstage
Making of "Stay Together for the Kids"
Recording Studio
Making of "First Date"
Friends
Credits

Bonus features
Music videos
"The Rock Show" (Directed by the Malloys)
"First Date" (Directed by the Malloys)
"Stay Together for the Kids" (Directed by Samuel Bayer)
"Stay Together for the Kids" (Original version) (Directed by Samuel Bayer)
Chicago Live
"First Date"
"Carousel"
"Aliens Exist"
"The Rock Show"
"Anthem Part Two"
Management
Rick DeVoe
Chris Georggin
Kristen Worden
Photo Gallery
Do you believe?
Mark Undercover
The Battle of the Enchanted Forest
Doctor Brian
The Making of "Stay Together for the Kids" (Original version)
1216 Beats
A Message to our Fans

Some UK versions of the DVD have a fault in which when Aliens Exist is selected from the Chicago Live menu, it instead plays the chapter Do You Believe? and the Aliens Exist video is unattainable.

Charts

References

External links

Blink-182
2002 films
American documentary films
Rockumentaries
2000s English-language films
2000s American films